Thaïs Blume (born 19 September 1984) is a Spanish actress. She debuted on television in 2008 with Sin tetas no hay paraíso, and is also known for playing Mati on El Príncipe.

Biography
The role that catapulted Thaïs Blume to fame was, practically, that of her debut. Between 2008 and 2009 she played Cristina on the Telecinco drama Sin tetas no hay paraíso. She put herself in the shoes of Cristina, an erotic film actress, during the three seasons that the series was broadcast.

In 2009 she starred in the film Luna Caliente with Eduard Fernández. It is an adaptation of the homonymous novel by Argentine writer Mempo Giardinelli directed by Vicente Aranda. In it, she played Ramona, a young woman who is immersed in an irrational mutual attraction with Juan (Fernández), a friend of her father who raped her.

In 2010 she returned to television with a leading role in the Cuatro series .

A year later, at the end of this, the Barcelona actress joined the cast of the second season of the series Hispania, la leyenda, where she played Gaia, a young slave who has served the Sulpicio family throughout her life. Blume also appeared on the spinoff Imperium, playing the same character.

Also in 2011 Blume joined the cast of the second season of the TVE series Gran Reserva, where she played Lorena, a waitress who falls in love with Daniel Reverte. Blume made an appearance in the first chapter of the third season that served to close her participation in the series.

In 2012, the film  was shot, directed by the actor Jordi Mollà and starring Rubén Ochandiano and Beatriz Montañés.

Also that year she joined the recurring cast of the TV3 series , where she played Paula, a young journalist of the magazine where the story is set. It is an adaptation of the homonymous novel by Catalan writer Sílvia Soler, in which she shared the screen with Agnès Busquets, and Silvia Abril among others.

Also in 2014 she joined the production of Telecino's El Príncipe, set in the Ceuta town of El Príncipe, a neighborhood of the city Príncipe Alfonso. Blume played Mati during the series' two seasons, an intelligent and brave policewoman who knows how to handle herself in a hostile world of men.

In 2016 she joined the fifth season of the after-dinner series Amar es para siempre, broadcast on Antena 3. There she played Nuria Salgado Sanz, a young lawyer who maintains a close relationship with Jaime Novoa Feijó (Javier Pereira).

Television
 2008–2009: Sin tetas no hay paraíso as Cristina Calleja on Telecinco
 2010:  as Isabel Gómez Acuña on Cuatro
 2011: Hispania, la leyenda as Gaia on Antena 3
 2011: Gran Reserva as Lorena on La 1
 2012: Imperium as Gaia on Antena 3
 2014: Los misterios de Laura as Irene (1 chapter) on La 1
 2014–2016: El Príncipe as Matilde "Mati" Vila Colomer on Telecinco
 2014–2015:  as Paula Nardi on TV3
 2016–2017: Amar es para siempre, as Nuria Salgado Sanz on Antena 3
 2018–present:  as Paula Salcedo on La 1
 2019: Promesas de arena as Berta on La 1.
 2020–: Servir y proteger as Lidia Alonso.

Film
 2009: Luna Caliente by Vicente Aranda, as Ramona
 2010:  by Jordi Mollá, as Thaïs

References

External links
 
 

1984 births
21st-century Spanish actresses
Actresses from Barcelona
Living people
Spanish film actresses
Spanish television actresses